Lasaki  is a village in the administrative district of Gmina Rudnik, within Racibórz County, Silesian Voivodeship, in southern Poland.
Hamlet had a German name Lassoky [1], in the years 1936 - 1945 Weidenmoor [1] . 

Name of the village probably comes from the word Lasok, which meant the workers of the forest. For the first time mentioned in the fifteenth century as a hamlet Sławikowa Sławikowski called Upper Las. (
Anna Bindacz: Gmina Rudnik - the land of castles and green. Racibórz: Wydawnictwo i Agencja Wydawnicza WAW Grzegorz Wawoczny, 2005, s. 20.  . Racibórz: Publishing and the Publishing Agency WAW Wawoczny Gregory, 2005, p. 20 )

The village has a population of 220.

Gallery

References

Lasaki